Vasily Ivanovich Berkov (Russian: Василий Иванович Берков) (Dutch: Wicher Berkhoff) (21 August 1794 in Vriezenveen, Netherlands – 5 April 1870 in Saint Petersburg, Russia) was a Russian shipbuilder and from 1829-1870 Director of the Admiralty Shipyard of Saint Petersburg, possibly in the rank of Counter-Admiral. Berkov deserves special credit for his translations of West-European literature on shipbuilding into Russian. He was one of the so-called Rusluie, a Dutch community in 18th and 19th century Saint Petersburg, most of whose members originated from Vriezenveen, Berkov's native town.

Education 
Berkov was the son of carpenter Albert Berends Berkhoff and Berendina van den Bosch, and left his native town at an early age for Saint Petersburg, where his grandparents Frederik van den Bosch and Clasina de Vries took him into their care. Unlike many of his peers who went into trade, Berkov decided on a career in the shipbuilding industry. In either 1815 or 1816 he successfully completed his six-year civilian apprenticeship program at the College for Shipbuilding Architecture in Saint Petersburg as a shipwright.

Career 
From 1815-16 to 1825 Berkov worked as Deputy Master-Shipbuilder at the Lodejnopolskaja Shipyard, in the Grebnoj Docks in Saint Petersburg, at the shipyards in the Don basins and in the Novgorod district. Here he built ships destined for inland shipping, as well as private luxury yachts for two senior civil servants: Viktor Kochubey and Aleksey Arakcheyev. He was also involved in the building of the Enterprise, the ship of explorer Otto Von Kotzebue. After a brief career in 1825 as Master-Shipbuilder at Saint Petersburg's City Wharfs, in 1826 he accepted the position of Deputy Navy-Inspector for Innovative and Technological Requirements, at his former training college.

This civilian college merged in 1826 with the equivalent navy college into the Academy of Navy Engineers. The training academy in St. Petersburg still exists under the name of Higher Academy for Marine Engineers (Военно-морского инженерного училища). In 1829 Berkov returned to the City Wharfs as Director. As such he participated in the merging in 1841-43 of the civilian City Wharfs with the adjacent Navy Admiralty Shipyard into the New Admiralty Shipyard, of which he became Director. He continued this position until his death in 1870. In the hierarchy of the Russian social class system, Berkov rose to the civilian rank of Acting State Councilor (4th class), which equals the rank of Counter-Admiral in the Navy. Whether Berkov had actually held a Navy Admiral rank is subject of debate among Dutch historians.

Translator 
Berkov was highly regarded in shipbuilding circles for his translations of shipbuilding literature into the Russian language. He had a talent for languages and was fluent in English, German, French, Russian and Dutch. Many of his translated works were published under Russian State authority. He also compiled the first Russian textbook on naval architecture, including a manual on the construction of yachts.

Personal life 
On May 13, 1821 Berkov married Alexandrine Volkova (1804–after 1870), daughter of the Imperial Cup Bearer/Table Setter Ivan Prokoviev Volkov and Nadeschda Volkova. The Russian Orthodox marriage took place in the St. Nicholas Naval Cathedral in Saint Petersburg. They are known to have had six children from this marriage: Elena (b.ca.1828), Nadezhda (b.1834), Victor (b.1837), Alexandra (b.1840), Maria (b.1842) and Alexander (b.1844). In 1846 Berkov acquired Russian nationality, and in 1847 he ascended into the Russian hereditary peerage. Despite his career in Russian service, Berkov stayed in contact with the Dutch merchant community in Saint Petersburg. In later life he returned once more to his birthplace Vriezenveen, where even his own sister did not recognize him. After his death in 1870 he was buried in the Evangelical-Lutheran Volkovo Cemetery in Saint Petersburg. His grave can still be found there today. In 2007 the Municipality of Vriezenveen named a street in his honour.

Honours 
 Order of Saint Vladimir, 4th class (1834)
 Order of Saint Stanislaus, 2nd class (1836)
 Order of Saint Anne, 2nd class with crown (1840)
Crimean War Medal (1853–56)

References 

Notes

Printed sources, Literature, Articles and Internet-publications.

  20 August 1798, foundation of the "College for Shipbuilding Architecture (20 августа 1798 г. Учреждение училищ корабельной архитектуры), archived from navy.su
 Admiralty Dockyards (203 Fontanka Embankment), archived from encspb.ru
 Admiralty Shipyard, archived from globalsecurity.org
  Berkhof, E., Wicher Berkhoff: from Vriezenvenian Carpenters Son to Russian Noble Man (Wicher Berkhoff: van Vriezenveens timmermanszoon tot Russisch edelman), About Vriezenveen (Waver 't Vjenne (dialect)) 35 (2011-3) and 36 (2011-4), 803-806 and 827-829. . See also onweersberkhof.com
  Berkov, Vasili Iv. (Берков Василий Ив.), in: Extended Biographical Encyclopedia (Большая биографическая энциклопедия) (2009), archived from dic.academic.ru
  Berkov,  Vasily Ivanovich (Берков Василий Иванович), archived from persons-info.com  (abbr.)
  Harmsen, D., Vriezenvenian Merchants in Russia (Vriezenveners in Rusland) (np 1966),  pag. 58-61
  Holtrop, P. and Th. van Staalduine, Baptismal Registers (Doopregisters), Marriage Registers (Huwelijksregisters), Death Registers (Overlijdensregisters), Church Members Registers (Registers van Lidmaten) and Lists of Holy Communion Attendees (Lijsten van Avondmaalgangers), in: Idem, The Dutch Reformed Church in Saint-Petersburg, 1713-1927. Texts copied from the Church Records, letters and other documents (De Hollandse Hervormde Kerk in Sint-Petersburg 1713-1927. Teksten uit kerkenraadsprotocollen, brieven en andere documenten) III (Kampen 2005). 
  Hosmar, J., Wicher Berkhoff, became Head of the Naval Shipyards in Kronstadt (Wicher Berkhoff werd chef van marinewerven in Kroonstad), in: Idem, Rusluie from Vriezenveen in the Empire of the Czar (Vriezenveense Rusluie in het Rijk der Tsaren) (Enschede 1976), pag. 32-36
  Hosmar, J., Carpenter became Head of the Naval Shipyards in Kronstadt  (Timmerman werd chef van Marinewerven in Kroonstad), in: W. van der Louw, Dutch Histories. Popular Magazine for (Local) History (Nederlandse historiën. Populair tijdschrift voor (streek) historie) 1 (Berkel and Rodenrijs 1976), pag. 55-58
  Hosmar, J. Vriezenvenians on the Czar's War Fleet (Vriezenveners bij de Tsaristische Oorlogsvloot), in: Idem, Sailing for Russia (De Ruslandvaarders) (Zaltbommel 1986), pag. 98-105. 
  Janssen, H. and L. Jonker, Stories Berkhof (Verhalen Berkhof), in: Idem, Recorded stories told by Vriezenvenians after their return from Russia after the revolution of 1917 (Opgetekende verhalen uit de overlevering van na de revolutie van 1917 teruggekeerde Rusluie) (ca. 1955), pag. ix-x
  New names for three streets in Vriezenveen (Andere naam voor drie straten in Vriezenveen), in: The Weekly. The Courier (De Weekkrant, de Koerier), d.d. 7 November 2007, pag.13
  Polovtsov, A. (ed.), Berkov, Vasily Ivanovich (Берков Василий Иванович), in: Idem, Russian Biographical Dictionary (Русский биографический словарь) II (Moskou 1896-1918), pag. 743-744, archived from dic.academic.ru
  School history Higher Naval Engineering College (История училища Военно-морского инженерного училища), archived from navy.ru
  Table of Ranks (Табель о рангах), archived from akunin.ru
  Wijngaarden, van - Xiounina, J., From assimilation to segregation:  The Dutch Colony in Saint-Petersburg,  1856-1917 (Van assimilatie tot segregatie: De Nederlandse kolonie in Sint-Petersburg, 1856-1917) (Groningen 2007). . See also irs.ub.rug.nl

1794 births
1870 deaths
People from Vriezenveen
Russian people of Dutch descent
Russian nobility
Imperial Russian Navy admirals
Linguists from Russia
Russian engineers
Russian shipbuilders
Recipients of the Order of St. Anna, 2nd class
Recipients of the Order of St. Vladimir, 4th class
Recipients of the Order of Saint Stanislaus (Russian), 2nd class